Nationality words link to articles with information on the nation's poetry or literature (for instance, Irish or France).

Events
 Nobel Prize in Literature is shared by French poet Frédéric Mistral and Spanish dramatist José Echegaray y Eizaguirre.
 The National Monthly in Canada publishes an article by Arthur John Arbuthnott Stringer on Charles G. D. Roberts titled "The Father of Canadian Poetry", a title which stuck to Roberts, an influential poet, long afterward.

Works published in English

United Kingdom
 John Davidson, The Testament of a Prime Minister
 Ford Madox Ford, The Face of the Night
 Thomas Hardy, The Dynasts: A drama of the Napoleonic Wars, Part I, followed by Part II (1906) and Part III (1908)
 Henry Newbolt, Songs of the Sea
 Alfred Noyes, Poems
 Edwin Arnold, Indian Poetry
 AE (George William Russell), The Divine Vision, and Other Poems
 Christina Rossetti, Poetical Works, edited by W. M. Rossetti
 Algernon Charles Swinburne, A Channel Passage, and Other Poems
 William Watson, For England

United States
 Florence Earle Coates (1850–1927), Mine and Thine
 Joel Chandler Harris, The Tar Baby and Other Rhymes of Uncle Remus
 Josephine Preston Peabody, Pan, A Choric Idyl
 Carl Sandburg, In Reckless Ecstasy
 John B. Tabb, The Rosary in Rhyme

Other in English
 Isabel Ecclestone Mackay, Between the Light, Canada
 Nagesh Vishwanath Pai (also spelled "Nagesh Vishwvanath Pai"), Angel of Misfortune, India, Indian poetry in English
 Agnes Ethelwyn Wetherald, The Radiant Road, Canada

Works published in other languages
 Alexander Blok, Stikhi o prekrasnoi Dame ("Verses to the Beautiful Lady"), Russia, an early work of the Silver Age of Russian Poetry
 Constantine P. Cavafy, Waiting for the Barbarians, Greece
 José Santos Chocano, Los cantos del Pacífico ("The Songs of the Pacific"), Peru
 Sophus Claussen, Djavlerier ("Diableries"), Denmark
 Zinaida Gippius, «Собрание стихов. 1889–1903» ("Collected Poems, 1889–1903"), Russia
 Pamphile Lemay, Les gouttelettes, sonnet sequence, French language, Canada
 Saint-John Perse, pen name of Marie-René Alexis Saint-Léger, Images à Crusoé, published when the author is 17 years old, France
 Charles Van Lerberghe, La Chanson d'Ève, France
 Swami Vivekananda, Nachuk Tahate Shyama, India, Bengali

Births
Death years link to the corresponding "[year] in poetry" article:
 January 21 – Richard P. Blackmur (died 1965), American poet and critic
 January 23 – Louis Zukofsky (died 1978), American poet and co-founder and primary theorist of the Objectivist group of poets
 February 2 – A. R. D. Fairburn (died 1957), New Zealander
 February 9 – Kikuko Kawakami 川上 喜久子 (died 1985), Japanese Shōwa period novelist, short-story writer and poet, a woman
 April 5 – Richard Eberhart (died 2005), American poet and winner of the Pulitzer Prize for Poetry in 1966 and a National Book Award in 1977
 April 27 – Cecil Day-Lewis (died 1972), Anglo-Irish poet, British Poet Laureate from 1967 to 1972, and mystery writer
 May 13 – Earle Birney (died 1995),  Canadian poet and two-time winner of the Governor General's Award for Literature (in 1942 and 1945)
 May 20 – Nagai Tatsuo 永井龍男, used the pen-name of "Tomonkyo" for his poetry (died 1990), Japanese Shōwa period novelist, short-story writer, haiku poet, editor and journalist
 May 26 – Necip Fazıl Kısakürek (died 1983), Turkish
 June 8 – Alice Rahon (died 1987), French-born Mexican surrealist poet and painter
 June 13 – John K. Ewers (died 1978), Australian
 July 5 – Harold Acton (died 1994), Anglo-Italian writer, scholar and dilettante
 July 12 – Pablo Neruda (died 1973), Chilean writer and Communist politician
 August 15 – Subedar Mahmoodmiya Mohammad Imam, popularly known as "Asim Randeri" (died 2009), Indian, Gujarati-language ghazal poet
 October 21 – Patrick Kavanagh (died 1967), Irish poet and novelist
 October 29 – Audrey Alexandra Brown (died 1998), Canadian
 December 21 – Johannes Edfelt (died 1997), Swedish poet
 December 28 – Hori Tatsuo 堀 辰雄 (died 1953), Japanese Shōwa period writer, poet and translator
 December 31 – Fumiko Hayashi 林 芙美子 (born this year or 1903 (sources disagree) – 1951), Japanese novelist, writer and poet (a woman)
 Also:
 J. A. R. McKellar (died 1932), Australian
 Premendra Mitra (died 1988), Bengali poet, novelist, short-story writer, including thrillers and science fiction
 Alexander Vvedensky (died 1941), Russian avant-garde poet

Deaths
 January 3 – Larin Paraske, 70 (born 1833), Finnish Izhorian oral poet and rune-singer
 January 8 – John Farrell (born 1851), Australian
 March 24 – Sir Edwin Arnold, 71, English poet and journalist
 July 6 – Abai Qunanbaiuly, 58 (born 1845), Kazakh poet, composer, philosopher and cultural reformer
 October 4 – Adela Florence Nicolson, 39, English poet writing under the pseudonym "Laurence Hope", of suicide
 October 11 – Trumbull Stickney, 40, American classical scholar and poet, from a brain tumor
 October 17 – Ștefan Petică, 27 (born 1877), Romanian Symbolist poet and writer, of tuberculosis

Awards and honors

See also

 20th century in poetry
 20th century in literature
 List of years in poetry
 List of years in literature
 French literature of the 20th century
 Silver Age of Russian Poetry
 Young Poland (Młoda Polska) a modernist period in Polish  arts and literature, roughly from 1890 to 1918
 Poetry

Notes

Poetry

20th-century poetry